WFSJ-LP is an LPFM radio station, licensed to Indiana, the seat of government for Indiana County, Pennsylvania. WFSJ-LP is licensed to operate at the assigned frequency of 103.7 MHz with a power output of 52 watts. The station is owned by Hilltop Baptist Church.

History

As "The Fish"
Original owner Godstock Ministries was founded by legendary Pittsburgh on-air personality Chris Lash at the turn of the century, mainly geared towards promoting Christian rock concerts in the Indiana County area. Discovering that a large number of people would turn out for Christian rock acts, Lash believed that the same community would be willing to support a like-formatted radio station. Godstock applied for the first round of LPFM frequencies in 2002, and on February 24, 2003, WFSJ went on the air as "Fish FM", and the station turned out to be a success.

As "The Switch"
The moniker was switched less than a year later to "The Switch", but the format and the music remained the same.

The Switch Fm 103.7 LPFM is an active license through 2022. The current format is a mix of Christian Hits and Alternative Classic Rock that fits with the message of living a meaningful life.

Live talk programming is aired Monday through Friday from 7:30 am to 9 am, hosted by Douglas Varner, as well as other slots occasionally filled by guest hosts.

The mission is to help fellow sojourner's with information and music that assists people in having 'a better day,' through music and educational wisdom and life coaching.

The station's license was transferred to Hilltop Baptist Church effective October 19, 2019.

External links
 WFSJ-LP official website
 

FSJ-LP
FSJ-LP
Indiana, Pennsylvania
Indiana County, Pennsylvania
Radio stations established in 2003